Brighton Lovers Walk Traction and Rolling Stock Maintenance Depot is a traction maintenance depot located in Brighton, East Sussex, England. The depot is situated adjacent to the Brighton Main Line and is to the north of Brighton station.

The depot code is BI.

History
The depot was opened in 1848 as a carriage works by the LB&SCR, being converted in 1933 to an EMU depot by the Southern Railway. At that time, it had adjoining five and seven-track dead-ended buildings.

In 1987, the depot's allocation included class 421, 422 and 423 EMUs. Around the same time, the depot was also used to stable locomotives, including classes 09, 33, 47 and 73.

Modernisation resulted in the five-track building being reduced to a four-track from 2002, and the depot was reopened for servicing Class 377 units in 2006. A mix of Bombardier Transportation and Southern Railway technicians are based here.

Allocation 
The depot's allocation consists of Gatwick Express Class 387 EMUs, Southern Class 377 EMUs and Class 313 EMUs.

References

Bibliography

Railway depots in England
Rail transport in East Sussex
Transport in Brighton and Hove